Qasımkənd or Kasymkend may refer to:
Kasymkend, Khachmaz, Azerbaijan
Qasımkənd, Khizi, Azerbaijan